Teimuraz II may refer to:

 Teimuraz II of Kakheti, King in 1732–1744
 Teimuraz II, Prince of Mukhrani, ruled in 1668–1688